Child's Play, also known as Kinderspiele, is a 1992 German film directed by Wolfgang Becker.

Plot
Micha, a young boy being beaten by his abusive father, joins other bullies at school to terrorize people for amusement, including his own brother.

References

External links

1992 films
1992 drama films
German drama films
1990s German-language films
Films directed by Wolfgang Becker (director, born 1954)
Films about children
Films set in West Germany
Films set in the 1960s
1990s German films